Jason Erkes (born November 10, 1969) is a former journalist, media strategist and entrepreneur. In the 1990s, Erkes began his career working for ABC7 Chicago News as a political researcher and field producer. He then worked as a special assistant for Illinois Attorney General, Roland Burris. During this period he played an active role in Burris' bid to become Illinois Governor. Erkes revisited the media in 1995 with a special projects position at Fox Chicago News where he and the production team won an Emmy award for a special they produced. Erkes remained at Fox News until 2001.

He moved into business after he was part of a group that purchased the near-bankrupt Chicago Sport and Social Club, a group well-known for its volleyball leagues on North Avenue Beach. Erkes served as President of the company for nearly 15 years, growing it substantially into the largest social club of its kind in the United States. While doing so, he was recognized by Crain's Chicago Business as part of their 40 Under 40 list in 2005. Erkes stepped down from the position in 2015 to pursue other ventures.

Erkes now teaches clients now to use the media to build their credibility through his business coaching practice and his crisis management company.

Career

Media and Political career 
Erkes began his career working as a journalist. In 1992, Erkes worked as a political researcher for ABC 7 Chicago, coordinating local political coverage and producing content for the station during President Bill Clinton's primary and general election. Erkes attended the Presidential inauguration and assisted with the live coverage for the station. He continued in politics for the next two years as a special assistant to the Illinois Attorney General, Roland Burris. Erkes oversaw large initiatives like a charitable grant donation fund and received an accommodation from the State of Illinois for organizing a statewide gun turn-in program. Erkes also played an instrumental role in Roland Burris’ bid to be Governor of Illinois.

Erkes returned to journalism at Fox News Chicago where he covered breaking news and politics as a field producer. He conducted a number of interviews with notable individuals, such as Sarah, Duchess of York, Johnnie Cochran and comedian Chris Rock. His daily duties were covering the City of Chicago with Mayor Richard M. Daley and the State of Illinois with Governor George Ryan. He also managed live coverage from various political conventions between 1996 and 2000 elections. Erkes was part of a team at Fox News that covered the impeachment of President Bill Clinton after his affair with Monica Lewinsky. While working at Fox Chicago, Erkes won an Emmy award for presenting News Specials in 1997. The particular award came after the reporting on the funeral of Joseph Cardinal Bernardin on WFLD TV when he was working as a Field Producer and Investigative Producer. He was also recognized in 2001 when he was a finalist at the Lisagor Awards as part of the WFLD team that made the final three in the exemplary journalism category.

As a side venture, Erkes developed an entrepreneurial product supporting Joe Lieberman's 2003 political campaign and launched the first-ever political campaign Kippah, Joe Beanie selling thousands across the world. The item was awarded "Campaign product of the year" by the Economist Magazine in the UK.

Chicago Sport and Social Club 
In late 2001, Erkes moved away from journalism and purchased Chicago Sport and Social Club with a group of investors. When Erkes took over the management of the business, it was a fairly stagnant business, with a handful of Chicago Park District permits and a mailing list of around 6,000 email addresses. The stutter in Chicago Sport and Social Club's fortunes came after their parent company went bust after the Dot-com bubble crash. During an interview with Crain's Chicago Business, Erkes stated the new investors "wanted to rebuild the company's brand name and re-establish the goodwill that had existed for so many years."

Erkes' work didn't go unnoticed in the city of Chicago and he was recognized by Crain's Chicago Business as one of the 40 Under 40 in the area. The award came due to the turnaround in Chicago Sport and Social Club's fortunes. At the time of the takeover, the sports and social club was said to have annual revenues of $2.1 million and over 45,000 participants. Its operations were spread over 22 cities, making it a difficult portfolio to manage and turn a profit from. Between 2001 and 2005, Erkes scaled back the number of cities they were focusing on to four, Chicago, San Francisco, Philadelphia and Orlando. During that period, the participation didn't shrink but grew, from 45,000 to over 80,000. Profits were also said to be up 400% during the same period. Due to the popularity of the Social Club, Erkes was asked to throw the first pitch at both Chicago Cubs and Chicago White Sox games.

In 2007, Erkes and his partners were the first to bring City Chase to the United States. The urban adventure event, which originated in Toronto, with teams competing in a city to win points through a variety of events. By 2013, Erkes grew the sport and social club to the largest of its kind in the United States. The growth in revenues came from corporate sponsorship and the development of new leagues and activities, with 80% of the revenue for the company coming from league fees. In 2015, Erkes announced that he would be stepping down as President of the Chicago Sport and Social Club after growing participation numbers to 110,000.

Erkes then moved into the field of crisis management and strategic communications. He and his company were strategic advisors to Illinois Representative Ron Sandack during his resignation. He also led the charge for Roland Burris to be seated when he was controversially appointed to the US Senate by Governor Rod Blagojevich. Erkes and his associates were awarded the Reed Award from Campaigns and Elections for the "Best Bare Knuckled Street Fight Victory" of 2010 for succeeding in their effort.  He was also Director of Communications for US Senate Candidate Blair Hull.

Erkes founded Crisis Strategy Group and has consulted pharmaceutical companies, politicians and entrepreneurs in the emerging medical cannabis industry through many high-profile crisis situations.

Cresco Labs 
Erkes started consulting with several cannabis companies early on in 2016 and got more involved as the emerging industry evolved. He was a contributor to several magazines, penning articles on managing crisis situations and preparing for crisis. While consulting with Chicago-based Cresco Labs, he was instrumental in launching the first celebrity chef-based cannabis edible line with James Beard Foundation Award Winning Chef Mindy Segal. Erkes was involved in all the corporate messaging for Cresco Labs, including the launching of a million-dollar education and awareness program for the Illinois medical marijuana program. The company was the first cannabis sponsor  of the Chicago Marathon. After joining the company's team full time as their Chief Communications Officer in 2018, Erkes helped the company go public on the Canadian Securities Exchange, launch the Pennsylvania medical marijuana program and enter the Ohio market with several acquisitions of vertically integrated companies and dispensaries. Erkes has been a spokesperson for the cannabis industry on media across the country talking about the uses of medical cannabis, the opioid crisis and each state's regulated cannabis program.

Philanthropy
Erkes has been dedicated to a number of fundraising efforts in the city of Chicago. In 2011, he raised money for the Chicago Chargers football team through the 100,000 participants at Chicago Sport and Social Club. He also served on an advisory board for Chicago's bid for the 2016 Olympic Games. He has been a board member of Special Olympics Chicago for many years helping recruit high profile celebrities to jump in Lake Michigan for their Polar Plunge. Erkes was also a celebrity host of Tickled Pink Chicago.

External links
 Official website

References

American male journalists
21st-century American businesspeople
American philanthropists
Living people
1969 births